Conophorini is a tribe of bee flies in the family Bombyliidae.

Genera
These four genera belong to the tribe Conophorini:
 Aldrichia Coquillett, 1894
 Conophorina Becker, 1920
 Conophorus Meigen, 1803
 Sparnopolius Loew, 1855

References

Bombyliidae
Brachycera tribes